The Saljūq-Nāma ("Book of Seljuk [Empire]") is a history of the Great Seljuk Empire written by the Persian historian Zahir al-Din Nishapuri around 1175. Written in Persian, it has been acknowledged as the primary source for Saljuq material for Persian works dating from 13th century to 15th century, which include; Rahat al-sudur, Jami al-tawarikh, Tarikh-i Guzida, Zubdat al-Tawarikh and Rawdat as-Safa. Abu l'Qasim Qashani, a historian who wrote about the Ilkhanids,  made alterations and additions to the original text, which was later misidentified as the original Saljuq-nama.

Content
The Saljuq-nama is vague concerning the history of the sultans prior to Toghrul III, as noted by Claude Cahen, that Nishapuri had "...relatively poor sources at his disposal for the Seljuqs before his own lifetime..." Yet it is a short, restrained history using different sources than those used by Arabic writers of that time. Its textual history is complicated; as a preface in rhyme, it first appears as the historical part of a compendium known as Rahat al-sudur. A later version appears in the 14th century compendium of histories known as Jami al-tawarikh, which was compiled by Rashid al-Din Fadl Allah, vizier of the Ilkhanids of Iran.

Modern era
In 1953, Ismail Afshar claimed he had found a copy of the Saljuq-nama. A.H. Morton believes this copy to be a work by Abu al-Qasim Kashani. Accordingly, no copy of the Saljuq-nama is believed to exist today. However, A.H. Morton is producing a text based on MS. Persian 22b which is an anonymous history of the Seljuqs dedicated to Sultan Toghrul III. Morton contends that this is a copy of Nishapuri's original work.

References

Sources

History books about the Middle East
Culture of the Seljuk Empire
Persian-language books
1170s books